Season 2007–08 saw Livingston compete in the First Division. They also competed in the Challenge Cup, League Cup and the Scottish Cup.

Results & fixtures

First Division

Challenge Cup

League Cup

Scottish Cup

League table

References

Livingston
Livingston F.C. seasons